Abingdon is a town in Washington County, Virginia, United States,  southwest of Roanoke. The population was 8,376 at the 2020 census. It is the county seat of Washington County. The town encompasses several historically significant sites and features a fine arts and crafts scene centered on the galleries and museums along Main Street.

Abingdon is part of the Kingsport−Bristol (TN)−Bristol (VA) Metropolitan Statistical Area, which is a component of the Johnson City−Kingsport−Bristol, TN-VA Combined Statistical Area − commonly known as the Tri-Cities region.

History

The region was long the territory of varying cultures of indigenous peoples, including the Chisca and Xualae. From the late 17th-century, it was occupied by the Cherokee Nation, whose territory extended from the present-day area of borders of Tennessee, Virginia, and Kentucky through the spine of North Carolina and later into Georgia.

Between 1748 and 1750, Dr. Thomas Walker, a principal in the Loyal Land Company, surveyed the land where the town of Abingdon is now situated. It was on the Great Road that Colonel William Byrd III ordered cut through the wilderness on to Kingsport, Tennessee. Walker called it the Wolf Hill Tract. In the twenty-first century, the town sponsored a public art event, in which artists created 27 wolf sculptures, which were installed around the town. Most were later sold at an auction to raise money for Advance Abingdon.

Between 1765 and 1770 James Douglas, Andrew Colville, George Blackburn, Joseph Black, Samuel Briggs and James Piper settled in and around present-day Abingdon under purchases from Dr. Thomas Walker. By 1773 there were enough settlers, primarily Scots-Irish, to establish Presbyterian congregations, and the Rev. Charles Cummings became the first settled pastor west of the Alleghany Mountains.

During Lord Dunmore's War, Joseph Black built Black's Fort in 1774 to protect local settlers in the region from attacks by the Cherokee of the Lower Towns. It consisted of a log stockade, with a few log cabins inside, where nearby settlers took refuge in event of attack. They retreated to the fort in 1776 when attacked by the war leader Dragging Canoe and his Chickamauga Cherokee forces. Hoping to push out the colonists, the Cherokee had allied with the British in the American Revolutionary War. The settlement was known as Black's Fort prior to being named Abingdon. Black, Briggs and Walker donated the 120 acres of land upon which the original town was laid out.

The area was at the intersection of two great Indian trails, which had followed ancient animal migration trails through the mountains. It was a prime location as a trade center and access point to the west and south. In 1776 the community of Black's Fort was made the county seat of the newly formed Washington county. In 1778, Black's Fort was incorporated as the town of Abingdon, said to be named for Abingdon-on-Thames the ancestral home of Martha Washington in Oxfordshire, England. Other possible namesakes for the town include Jake Dore's home in Abington, Pennsylvania, or Lord Abingdon, friend of settler William Campbell.

With a bequest of $10,000 from salt entrepreneur William King, the Abingdon Male Academy opened in 1824. By 1830, over forty students were enrolled. It continued to thrive until 1861 when classes were suspended during the Civil War, and eventually closed in 1905. The property later became the Abingdon High School and is now home to the William King Museum of Art.

Martha Washington College, a school for women, operated in Abingdon from 1860 to 1932 in the former residence of Gen. Francis Preston which was built about 1832.  Since 1935 the building has been occupied and operated as a hotel, the Martha Washington Inn.  In 1867, Roman Catholics opened Villa Maria Academy of the Visitation for the education of young ladies. The Stonewall Jackson Female Institute operated from 1868 to 1930 in the former residence of Gov. John B. Floyd next to the Preston home.

The Barter Theatre, the state theatre of Virginia, was opened in Abingdon in 1933 during the Great Depression. It is now the longest-running professional equity theatre in the United States.

Abingdon is the final stop along the Virginia Creeper Trail, which allows pedestrian, cyclist and equestrian traffic. This rail-to-trail conversion is 35 miles long, extending from Whitetop Mountain through Damascus, Virginia, with the trailhead in Abingdon. The Historical Society of Washington County, Virginia, located in Abingdon, serves as a regional genealogy center, in addition to being a repository for Washington County history.

The Abingdon Historic District, Abingdon Bank, Mont Calm, Moonlite Theatre, Dr. William H. Pitts House, White's Mill, and Baker-St. John House are listed on the National Register of Historic Places.

Climate

Geography
Abingdon is located at  (36.709773, −81.975694).

According to the United States Census Bureau, the town has a total area of 8.3 square miles (21.6 km), all land.

The town is located in the Great Appalachian Valley, between the Middle Fork and the North Fork of the Holston River.

Demographics

As of the census of 2020, there were 8,376 people, 3,726 households residing in the town. The population density was 1,039 people per square mile (360.2/km). There were 3,788 housing units at an average density of 454.1 per square mile (175.4/km). The racial makeup of the town was 94% White, 2.2% African American, 0.2% Native American, 1.1% Asian, and 1.8% from two or more races. Hispanic or Latino of any race were 0.8% of the population.

There were 3,522 households, out of which 23.3% had children under the age of 18 living with them, 45.6% were married couples living together, 10.6% had a female householder with no husband present, and 40.6% were non-families. 36.7% of all households were made up of individuals, and 14.9% had someone living alone who was 65 years of age or older. The average household size was 2.08 and the average family size was 2.72.

In the town, the population was spread out, with 18.2% under the age of 18, 8.2% from 18 to 24, 27.4% from 25 to 44, 25.5% from 45 to 64, and 23.4% who were 65 years of age or older. The median age was 42 years. For every 100 females, there were 81.0 males. For every 100 females age 18 and over, there were 77.6 males.

The median income for a household in the town was $45,848, and the median income for a family was $46,106. Males had a median income of $32,005 versus $22,844 for females. The per capita income for the town was $22,486. About 7.3% of families and 10.1% of the population were below the poverty line, including 10.4% of those under age 18 and 9.7% of those age 65 or over.

Education
Abingdon is served by Washington County Public Schools, where students attend Abingdon Elementary, Watauga Elementary, Greendale Elementary, E.B. Stanley Middle School, and Abingdon High School.

Virginia Highlands Community College located in Abingdon is the local community college offering 2-year degrees.

Emory & Henry College is located 7 miles outside of town.

Southwest Virginia Higher Education Center, on the campus of VHCC, provides the region with access to undergraduate and graduate degree programs and courses. Participating academic institutions include: Emory & Henry College, Old Dominion University, Radford University, University of Virginia, University of Virginia's College at Wise, Virginia Commonwealth University, Virginia Highlands Community College, and Virginia Tech.

Points of interest

William King Museum of Art
 Abingdon Historic District, which includes architecture dating back to the late 1700s, as well as notable buildings like the Abingdon Arts Depot, Barter Theatre and the Martha Washington Inn.
 The Historical Society of Washington County, Virginia, founded in 1936 to preserve the history and genealogy of Southwest Virginia. This non-profit's library contains over 7,000 books, 200,000 digital images, and over one million indexed records. 
 Barter Theatre, designated as the "State Theatre of Virginia" in 1946 and is one of the longest-running professional regional theatres in the nation. In 1940, Gregory Peck, before becoming a major star, worked in exchange for food and performed at the Barter Theatre, appearing in five plays including Family Portrait and On Earth as It Is.
 The northern end of the Overmountain Victory National Historic Trail lies in Abingdon at the Abingdon Muster Grounds.
 Virginia Creeper Trail, a 34.3-mile rail trail that runs from Abingdon to Whitetop, Virginia.
 The Virginia Highlands Festival, started in 1948 by Robert Porterfield, founder of the Barter Theatre.The festival has now grown into a 16-day event offering a variety of venues celebrating Appalachian arts and crafts.
 The Crooked Road: Virginia's Heritage Music Trail, which explores Virginia's mountain regions and the heritage of the mountain people.
 Southwest Virginia Cultural Center & Marketplace, formerly known as Heartwood. Visitor center, music venue, artisan marketplace and community space.
 St. Thomas Episcopal Church, a historic church located near the location of Black's Fort.

Notable people
Three Virginia governors lived here: Wyndham Robertson, David Campbell, and John B. Floyd.

 Robert Armstrong, (1792–1854), born in Abingdon, United States Army officer and candidate for Governor of Tennessee
 Martin Beaty (1784–1856), born in Abingdon, United States Congressman from Kentucky
 Francis Preston Blair (1791–1876), born in Abingdon, journalist and politician
 Colette Burson (born 1970), writer, screenwriter, producer, and director
 Scott Cooper (born 1970), film director
 Elizabeth Litchfield Cunnyngham (1831-1911), missionary and church worker
 James King Gibson (1812–1879), born in Abingdon, United States Congressman from Virginia
 Gail Harris (1931–2012), born in Abingdon, major league baseball player for New York Giants and Detroit Tigers
 Henry Jackson (1811–1857), Minnesota pioneer
 John W. Johnston (1818–1889), nephew of Gen. Joseph E. Johnston, served as United States Senator after Virginia readmitted to the Union in 1869.
 Joseph E. Johnston (1807–1891), lived in Abingdon as a boy, Confederate general in the American Civil War.
Frances Fisher (born 1954), American actress, worked at The Barter Theatre before being discovered by Hollywood.
Eric McClure (1978–2021), driver in the NASCAR Nationwide Series.
 William McMillan (1764–1804), born in Abingdon, lawyer. district attorney, and United States Congressman from Ohio Territory.
 Henry Warren Ogden (1842–1905), born in Abingdon, became a Louisiana planter and politician; Confederate States of America lieutenant and prisoner of war.
 Granville Henderson Oury (1825–1885), born in Abingdon, captain in the Confederate Army and later United States Congressman from Arizona.
 John S. Preston (1809–1881), born in Abingdon, Confederate general in the American Civil War and South Carolina politician
Robert Sheffey (1820–1902), grew up in Abingdon, eccentric Methodist circuit-rider and evangelist.
 Hiram Emory Widener Jr. (1923–2007), born and died in Abingdon, judge of the United States Court of Appeals for the Fourth Circuit, and one of the longest-serving federal judges in United States history.

Mayors of Abingdon, Virginia
 John Montgomery Preston 1834–1836, 1842–1843
 J. M. Butt 1910–1912
 T.H. Crabtree 1912–1916, 1926–1930, 1936–1940.
 A.P. Hutton 1920–1922
 George F. Grant 1916–1920
 R.B. Hagy 1922–1926, 1931–1935
 E.W. Potts 1935–1936
 T.C. Phillips 1940–1946
 Ronald C. Craig 1946–1948
 John C. Summers Jr. 1948–1950
 Charles Henry Butt 1950–1966
 J.A. Johnson 1966–1972
 George W. Summerson 1972–1978
 Harry L. Coomes 1978–1982
 French Moore Jr. 1982–1988
 Joe Phipps 1988–1998
 Lois Humphries 1998–2008
 Ed Morgan 2008–2016
 Cathy Lowe 2016–2018
 J. Wayne Craig 2018–2020
 Derek Webb 2020–2022
 Amanda Pillion 2023-Present

References

External links

 
 Abingdon, Virginia, Official visitor website

Towns in Virginia
Towns in Washington County, Virginia
County seats in Virginia
Kingsport–Bristol metropolitan area
Southwest Virginia
Populated places established in 1778
1778 establishments in Virginia